Estonia competed at the 2016 European Athletics Championships in Amsterdam, Netherlands, between 6 and 10 July 2016.

Medalists

Results
Men

Track & road events

Field Events

Combined events – Decathlon

Women

Track & road events

Field Events

Combined events – Heptathlon

Key
Q = Qualified for the next round
q = Qualified for the next round as a fastest loser or, in field events, by position without achieving the qualifying target

References

Participants and results

European Athletics Championships
2016
Nations at the 2016 European Athletics Championships